Yang Jiechang (born 1956 in Foshan, Guangdong Province) is a contemporary artist of Chinese origin. He is known for his proficiency in traditional Chinese media.

Life
Yang Jiechang was born in Foshan in Guangdong Province, PR China, in 1956. He grew up during the Cultural Revolution (1966–1976), but received a traditional education from his grandfather. From him he learned, how to write Chinese characters with a brush. He continued his training in calligraphy and other traditional Chinese techniques, such as paper-mounting, ink painting and meticulous color painting as an apprentice at the Foshan Folk Art Institute (1973-1978). He then studied Chinese painting at the Guangzhou Academy of Fine Arts (1978-1982), where he taught until 1988. Yang Jiechang was part of the first generation of art students after the Cultural Revolution - universities and art academies reopened in late 1977 - , and the beginning of his artistic career coincided with China's political opening in the late 1970s and 1980s. In 1988, French curator Jean-Hubert Martin, at the time director of the Centre Georges Pompidou in Paris, invited him to take part in the exhibition "Magiciens de la terre", held in the Centre Pompidou in 1989. Yang emigrated to Europe in 1988, where he still lives and works today.

Oeuvre 
Yang Jiechang works in a variety of media, such as video, photography, installation and performance. He is however best known for his proficiency in traditional Chinese media - ink painting, meticulous color painting and calligraphy -, as well as for his capacity to integrate these traditional techniques into a contemporary context. He made his international renown with his series of monumental, monochrome black ink paintings entitled Hundred Layers of Ink (1989-1999), exhibited for the first time in the exhibition "Magiciens de la terre".  Fo these large works on paper the artist applies layers and layers of pure and of diluted ink onto Xuan paper until the black ink turns luminescent. The creative process itself actually is the deconstruction of Chinese painting into its basic elements: paper, water, and ink.  The simple abstract forms the artist depicts seem to stretch beyond their margins, figure and ground merge. "The Hundred Layers of Ink series displays neither skill nor imagery or personality and painting here rather is a way of contemplation than a means of representation".

After his emigration to Europe Yang was fascinated by Romanticism, in particular German Romanticism, with its subjective quest for spirituality, its love for nature and the search for the obscure and unfinished. Both, Eastern spirituality, in particular Daoism, and Romanticism are present in Yang's oeuvre on a conceptual and on an aesthetic level. His Hundred Layers of Ink series (1989 - 1999), or later works, like Scroll of Secret Merit (2004), or again Double View - Crosss (2014) show the artists interest in aesthetic crudeness and immediacy, as well as his quest for self-sublimation.

Yang Jiechang's more recent paintings (since 2000) are mainly figurative. For these works he often uses the so-called meticulous color technique on silk, a lavish technique using vegetal and mineral colors, combining realistic elements with vivid and bold brushstrokes. In the early Twentieth Century this traditional technique was further developed by the so-called Lingnan School or Cantonese School. The choice of technique, but also of critical subjects and his iconoclastic attitude shows Yang Jiechang's affinity to his local heritage. Works in this technique comprise Crying Landscape (2003), Tomorrow Cloudy Sky (2005), Stranger than Paradise (2009-2016), Tale of the Eleventh Day (2011-2022), as well as various self-portraits.

Another important technique in Yang Jiechang's oeuvre is calligraphy. He not only uses Chinese characters but also Western languages for his unorthodox calligraphies, that purposely contain mistakes and aesthetic blunders. These works comprise Testament (1991), I Still Remember (1999-2019), Oh My God/ Oh Diu (2002-2005), Dark Writing (2019). Oh My God/ Oh Diu is a calligraphy diptych. Both panels are covered with the exclamation "Oh, My God" and with the Cantonese swearword "Oh, Diu". Corresponding videos record the artist writing and pronouncing the expressions. The work is a reaction to the events of 9/11. Among the images broadcast by the mass media over and over again, only one appeared authentic to the artist: A young man running from the collapsing twin towers and shouting "Oh, my god".

Exhibitions

Yang has participated in numerous exhibitions, including:
 China Avant-Garde, National Art Museum of China, Beijing, 1989
 Les Magiciens de la terre, Centre Pompidou, Paris, 1989
 Chine demain pour hier, Pourrières, France, 1990
 Silent Energy, Modern Art Oxford, 1993
 Shenzhen International Ink Biennial, Shenzhen, PR China, 1998, 2000, 2002
 Pause Gwangju Biennale, Korea, 2002
 Zone of Urgency, Venice Biennale, Venice, 2003
 La Nuit Blanche, Paris, France, 2004
 Le moine et le démon, Musée d'art contemporain de Lyon, Lyon, France, 2004
 All Under Heaven, Muhka, Antwerp, Belgium, 2004
 Beyond, Second Guangzhou Triennial, Guanzhou, PR China, 2005
 Layered Landscapes, Stanford Art Gallery, Stanford, USA, 2005
 Biennial of Emergency, Palais de Tokyo, Paris, 2005
 Liverpool Biennial, Liverpool, UK, 2006
 Laboratoires pour un avenir incertain, La Force de l’Art - 1st Paris Triennial, Grand Palais, Paris, 2006
 Capolavoro, Palazzo di Primavera, Terni, Rome, 2006
 Istanbul Biennial, Istanbul, 2007
 Metamorphosis - The Generation of Transformation in Chinese Contemporary Art, Tampere Art Museum, Tampere, Finland, 2007
 New Wave ’85 UCCA, Beijing, PR China, 2007
 Onda Anomala – Manifesta 7, Trento, Italy, 2008
 Against Exclusion, Third Moscow Biennale of Contemporary Art, Garage, Moscow, 2009
 Lyon Biennial, Museum of Modern and Contemporary Art, Lyon, France, 2009
 Qui a peur des artistes ? Une sélection d’œuvres de la Fondation François Pinault, Musée de Dinard, France, 2009
 Hareng Saur : Ensor et l’art contemporain, MSK and S.M.A.K., Ghent, Belgium, 2010
 Le Jardin Emprunté, Jardin du Palais-Royal, Paris, 2010
 The World Belongs to You, Palazzo Grassi, Fondation F. Pinault, Venice, 2011
 Death Matters, Tropenmuseum, Amsterdam, Netherlands, 2011
 Reactivation, Shanghai Biennale, Shanghai, PR China, 2012
 Sehnsucht, Gaasbeek Castle, Belgium, 2012
 Clouds, Museum of Sketches for Public Art, Lund, Sweden, 2012
 Zizhiqu/ Autonomous Regions, Times Museum Guangzhou, PR China, 2013
 Ink Art: Past as Present in Contemporary China, Metropolitan Museum of Art, New York, 2013
 China's Changing Landscape, Nordic Watercolour Museum, Sweden, 2014
 La Chine ardente. Sculptures monumentales contemporaines, Mons - European Capital of Culture, Belgium, 2015
 Harmony and Transition. Chinese Landscapes in Contemporary Art, MARTa Herford, Herford, Germany, 2015
 Fragmentary Narratives, Stanford Art Gallery, Stanford, USA, 2016
 Carambolages, Grand Palais, Paris, 2016
 Carte Blanche à Yang Jiechang, Musée Guimet, Paris, 2022

Filmography 
 2013 - The Enduring Passion for Ink
 2022 - Carte Blanche

References

Further reading
 Yang Jiechang - No Shadow Kick, Tang Contemporary, Beijing, 2008.
 Britta Erickson, "Yang Jiechang: The Communist Party Didn't Pay the Bill", Art Asia Pacific 65 (Sep/Oct 2009): 116-123.
 I Often Do Bad Things. Yang Jiechang: Texts and Works 1982 - 2016, Martina Köppel-Yang (ed), Verlag Kettler, Dortmund, 2017

External links
 Jiechang biography, Ink Studio
 Yang Jiechang Discusses His Work 100 Layers of Ink in Ink Art: Past As Present in Contemporary China – video on the website of the Metropolitan Museum of Art, 2014

1956 births
People from Foshan
Chinese contemporary artists
Living people